Pilesgrove Township is a township in Salem County, in the U.S. state of New Jersey. As of the 2020 United States census, the township's population was 4,183, an increase of 167 (+4.2%) from the 2010 census count of 4,016, which in turn reflected an increase of 93 (+2.4%) from the 3,923 counted in the 2000 census.

Pile's Grove was first mentioned in a deed dated April 15, 1701, through the date of the township's original corporation is unknown. Pilesgrove was incorporated as one of New Jersey's original group of 104 townships that were established on February 21, 1798. Portions of the township were taken on December 6, 1769, to form Pittsgrove Township and on July 26, 1882, to create Woodstown. The township was named for Thomas Pyle.

In 1979, Pilesgrove Township enacted the state's first right-to-farm law, protecting farming as a "natural right hereby ordained to exist as a permitted use everywhere in the Township of Pilesgrove."

Geography
According to the United States Census Bureau, the township had a total area of 35.17 square miles (91.09 km2), including 34.94 square miles (90.48 km2) of land and 0.23 square miles (0.61 km2) of water (0.67%). The Salem River flows through the township.

The township borders the Salem County municipalities of Alloway Township, Carneys Point Township, Mannington Township, Oldmans Township and Upper Pittsgrove Township. Pilesgrove Township also borders Gloucester County. The Borough of Woodstown is an independent municipality completely surrounded by Pilesgrove Township, making it part of 21 pairs of "doughnut towns" in the state, where one municipality entirely surrounds another. Woodstown serves as the more densely settled commercial core of the paired communities, while Pilesgrove is more agricultural.

Unincorporated communities in the township include Avis Mills, Courees Landing, East Lake, Eldridges Hill, Fenwick, Friendship, Milltown, Paulding, Point Airy, Richmanville, Sharptown, Union Grove and Yorktown. The census-designated place of Auburn is in the northwest part of the township, extending into Oldmans Township.

The Pilesgrove Solar Farm is one of the largest in the state, covering  with 71,000 solar panels that generate 20 megawatts of electricity, enough to provide power for more than 5,000 homes.

Demographics

2010 census

The Census Bureau's 2006–2010 American Community Survey showed that (in 2010 inflation-adjusted dollars) median household income was $87,083 (with a margin of error of +/− $12,552) and the median family income was $102,870 (+/− $13,121). Males had a median income of $63,352 (+/− $12,197) versus $59,700 (+/− $6,558) for females. The per capita income for the borough was $34,966 (+/− $3,754). About 0.8% of families and 4.4% of the population were below the poverty line, including 9.5% of those under age 18 and 4.2% of those age 65 or over.

2000 census
As of the 2000 United States census there were 3,923 people, 1,216 households, and 994 families residing in the township. The racial makeup of the township was 84.63% White, 12.18% African American, 0.28% Native American, 0.92% Asian, 0.05% Pacific Islander, 1.07% from other races, and 0.87% from two or more races. Hispanic or Latino of any race were 2.98% of the population.

There were 1,216 households, out of which 35.4% had children under the age of 18 living with them, 71.1% were married couples living together, 7.0% had a female householder with no husband present, and 18.2% were non-families. 14.9% of all households were made up of individuals, and 6.8% had someone living alone who was 65 years of age or older.  The average household size was 2.91 and the average family size was 3.24.

In the township the population was spread out, with 23.8% under the age of 18, 8.4% from 18 to 24, 27.2% from 25 to 44, 26.2% from 45 to 64, and 14.4% who were 65 years of age or older.  The median age was 40 years. For every 100 females, there were 107.1 males.  For every 100 females age 18 and over, there were 107.9 males.

The median income for a household in the township was $66,042, and the median income for a family was $71,629. Males had a median income of $50,833 versus $31,806 for females. The per capita income for the township was $27,400.  About 2.3% of families and 3.4% of the population were below the poverty line, including 2.8% of those under age 18 and 2.8% of those age 65 or over.

Government

Local government
Pilesgrove is governed under the Township form of New Jersey municipal government, one of 141 municipalities (of the 564) statewide that use this form, the second-most commonly used form of government in the state. The Township Committee consists of three members elected at-large in partisan elections to serve three-year terms on a staggered basis, with one seat coming up for election each year as part of the November general election in a three-year cycle. At an annual reorganization meeting, the council selects one of its members to serves as mayor and another as deputy mayor.

, members of the Pilesgrove Township Committee are Mayor Kevin Eachus (R, term on committee ends December 31, 2024; term as mayor ends 2022), Deputy Mayor David R. Bonowski (R, term on committee ends 2023; term as deputy mayor ends 2022) and Joseph Crevino (R, 2022).

In August 2014, the Township Council selected Joseph Crevino to fill the vacant seat of Jessie B. Smith, who had resigned the previous month from a term expiring in December 2016.

In 2018, the township had an average property tax bill of $8,387, the highest in the county, compared to an average bill of $8,767 statewide.

Federal, state and county representation 
Pilesgrove Township is located in the 2nd Congressional District and is part of New Jersey's 3rd state legislative district.

 

Salem County is governed by a five-member Board of County Commissioners who are elected at-large to serve three-year terms of office on a staggered basis, with either one or two seats coming up for election each year. At an annual reorganization meeting held in the beginning of January, the board selects a Director and a Deputy Director from among its members. , Salem County's Commissioners (with party, residence and term-end year listed in parentheses) are 
Director Benjamin H. Laury (R, Elmer, term as commissioner ends December 31, 2024; term as director ends 2022), 
Deputy Director Gordon J. "Mickey" Ostrum, Jr. (R, Pilesgrove Township, term as commissioner ends 2024; term as deputy director ends 2022),  
R. Scott Griscom (R, Mannington Township, 2022), 
Edward A. Ramsay (R, Pittsgrove Township, 2023) and
Lee R. Ware (D, Elsinboro Township, 2022). Constitutional officers elected on a countywide basis are 
County Clerk Dale A. Cross (R, 2024),
Sheriff Charles M. Miller (R, 2024) and 
Surrogate Nicki A. Burke (D, 2023).

Politics
As of March 2011, there were a total of 2,908 registered voters in Pilesgrove Township, of which 678 (23.3% vs. 30.6% countywide) were registered as Democrats, 873 (30.0% vs. 21.0%) were registered as Republicans and 1,354 (46.6% vs. 48.4%) were registered as Unaffiliated. There were 3 voters registered as Libertarians or Greens. Among the township's 2010 Census population, 72.4% (vs. 64.6% in Salem County) were registered to vote, including 90.9% of those ages 18 and over (vs. 84.4% countywide).

In the 2012 presidential election, Republican Mitt Romney received 56.5% of the vote (1,273 cast), ahead of Democrat Barack Obama with 42.1% (950 votes), and other candidates with 1.4% (31 votes), among the 2,278 ballots cast by the township's 2,990 registered voters (24 ballots were spoiled), for a turnout of 76.2%. In the 2008 presidential election, Republican John McCain received 1,255 votes (53.2% vs. 46.6% countywide), ahead of Democrat Barack Obama with 1,051 votes (44.6% vs. 50.4%) and other candidates with 26 votes (1.1% vs. 1.6%), among the 2,358 ballots cast by the township's 2,911 registered voters, for a turnout of 81.0% (vs. 71.8% in Salem County). In the 2004 presidential election, Republican George W. Bush received 1,246 votes (58.8% vs. 52.5% countywide), ahead of Democrat John Kerry with 845 votes (39.9% vs. 45.9%) and other candidates with 22 votes (1.0% vs. 1.0%), among the 2,120 ballots cast by the township's 2,695 registered voters, for a turnout of 78.7% (vs. 71.0% in the whole county).

In the 2013 gubernatorial election, Republican Chris Christie received 70.8% of the vote (1,035 cast), ahead of Democrat Barbara Buono with 26.7% (390 votes), and other candidates with 2.5% (36 votes), among the 1,478 ballots cast by the township's 3,003 registered voters (17 ballots were spoiled), for a turnout of 49.2%. In the 2009 gubernatorial election, Republican Chris Christie received 869 votes (50.4% vs. 46.1% countywide), ahead of Democrat Jon Corzine with 629 votes (36.5% vs. 39.9%), Independent Chris Daggett with 187 votes (10.8% vs. 9.7%) and other candidates with 18 votes (1.0% vs. 2.0%), among the 1,724 ballots cast by the township's 2,919 registered voters, yielding a 59.1% turnout (vs. 47.3% in the county).

Education 
The Woodstown-Pilesgrove Regional School District serves public school students in pre-kindergarten through twelfth grade from Woodstown and Pilesgrove Township. As of the 2020–21 school year, the district, comprised of four schools, had an enrollment of 1,425 students and 126.5 classroom teachers (on an FTE basis), for a student–teacher ratio of 11.3:1. Schools in the district (with 2020–21 enrollment data from the National Center for Education Statistics) are 
William Roper Early Childhood Learning Center with 83 students in grades PreK-K, 
Mary S. Shoemaker Elementary School with 470 students in grades 1-5, 
Woodstown Middle School with 278 students in grades 6-8 and 
Woodstown High School with 579 students in grades 9-12. Students from neighboring Alloway Township, Oldmans Township and Upper Pittsgrove Township attend the high school as part of sending/receiving relationships. A majority of public school students in grades 9–12 from Oldmans Township attend Penns Grove High School as part of a sending/receiving relationship with the Penns Grove-Carneys Point Regional School District, with the balance attending Woodstown High School.

Transportation

Roads and highways

The New Jersey Turnpike crosses the northwest corner of Pilesgrove Township. U.S. Route 40 traverses the township roughly east to west and Route 45 crosses the township roughly south to north, with the two roadways meeting in Woodstown, the donut hole at the center.  County Route 581 cuts through the southeast corner.

Public transportation
NJ Transit provides bus service between Salem and Philadelphia on the 401 route.

The  southern portion of the freight rail Salem Branch, operated under contract by Southern Railroad of New Jersey, runs through the township.

Wineries
 Auburn Road Vineyard
 Chestnut Run Farm

Notable people

People who were born in, residents of, or otherwise closely associated with Pilesgrove Township include:
 Jim Cook Jr. (born 1987), former journalist for the South Jersey Times
 Nathan Dunn (1782–1844), businessman and philanthropist
 Nathan T. Stratton (1813–1887), represented New Jersey's 1st congressional district in the United States House of Representatives from 1851 to 1855

References

External links

Pilesgrove Township's website
Pilesgrove Township page on Salem County website
Woodstown-Pilesgrove Regional School District

School Data for the Woodstown-Pilesgrove Regional School District, National Center for Education Statistics

 
1798 establishments in New Jersey
Populated places established in 1798
Township form of New Jersey government
Townships in Salem County, New Jersey